Kazunori Komatsu (born 9 April 1948) is a sailor from Kanagawa, Japan, who represented his country at the 1988 Summer Olympics in Busan, South Korea as helmsman in the Soling. With crew members Kazuo Hanaoka and Tadashi Ikeda they took the 11th place. Kazunori with crew members Yasuharu Fujiwara and Hideaki Takashiro took 11th place during the 1992 Summer Olympics in Barcelona, Spain as helmsman in the Soling. Finally Komatsu with crew members Masatoshi Hazama and Kazuyuki Hyodo took 19th place during the 1996 Summer Olympics in Savannah, United States as helmsman in the Soling.

References

Living people
1948 births
Sailors at the 1976 Summer Olympics – 470
Sailors at the 1988 Summer Olympics – Soling
Sailors at the 1992 Summer Olympics – Soling
Sailors at the 1996 Summer Olympics – Soling
Olympic sailors of Japan